Chad competed at the 1984 Summer Olympics in Los Angeles, United States.  Chad returned to the Olympic Games after boycotting both the 1976 and 1980 Games.

Athletics

Key
Note–Ranks given for track events are within the athlete's heat only
Q = Qualified for the next round
q = Qualified for the next round as a fastest loser or, in field events, by position without achieving the qualifying target
NR = National record
N/A = Round not applicable for the event
Bye = Athlete not required to compete in round

Men

Field events

References
Official Olympic Reports

Nations at the 1984 Summer Olympics
1984
Olym